Sorochinsky District is an administrative district (raion), one of the thirty-five in Orenburg Oblast, Russia. It is located in the west of the oblast. Its administrative center is the town of Sorochinsk (which is not administratively a part of the district). As of the 2010 Census, the total population of the district was 14,192.

Administrative and municipal status
Within the framework of administrative divisions, Sorochinsky District is one of the thirty-five in the oblast. The town of Sorochinsk serves as its administrative center, despite being incorporated separately as an administrative unit with the status equal to that of the districts.

As a municipal division, the territory of the district and the territory of the Town of Sorochinsk are incorporated together as Sorochinsky Urban Okrug. Prior to June 1, 2015, the district was incorporated as Sorochinsky Municipal District, while the Town of Sorochinsk was incorporated separately as Sorochinsk Urban Okrug.

References

Notes

Sources



Districts of Orenburg Oblast